Mary Salome and Zebedee is a wood sculpture by Tilman Riemenschneider. It originally formed the right wing of an altarpiece showing the family of the Mary, mother of Jesus. The central scene would have shown Saint Anne seated with her daughter Mary and the Christ Child. Mary Salome was another daughter of Saint Anne, half-sister of Mary, and wife of Zebedee. Riemenschneider was one of the most important sculptors in southern Germany in the late fifteenth and sixteenth century. He specialised in carving limewood altarpieces, some of which were painted. Others, such as this example which was carved in Würzburg in about 1501–05, were given translucent glaze. This treatment not only allowed the rich colour of the wood to show through, but rendered the fine carving of the faces and drapery more visible.

Mary Salome is seated on a cushioned throne, turning her body to the left. In her right hand she holds an open book on which her hand is resting. She is dressed in a waisted gown over which is draped a mantle falling from her left shoulder. The half-length figure of Zebedee stands behind her, resting on his left elbow, and holding a closed book in his right hand; he is expressively depicted as an elderly man with sunken cheeks. He is dressed in a buttoned robe.

Bibliography
 

1500s sculptures
Books in art
Sculptures of the Victoria and Albert Museum
Sculptures by Tilman Riemenschneider
Sculptures of men
Sculptures of women